It Takes Two (Chinese: 難兄難弟) is a 1982 Hong Kong comedy film directed by Karl Maka and starring Dean Shek and Richard Ng.

Cast
Dean Shek as Shek
Richard Ng as Ai Don-low
Frances Yip as Miss Yip
Cherie Chung as Chu
Lau Sze-hong as Chun
Wong Ching as Boss Wong / Jaws
Sek Yin-chi as Robin
Cheng Mang-ha as face lift beautician
Fung King-man as Loanshark Bing
George Lam as olives peddlar
Tsui Hark as taoist priest
Teddy Robin as clothes peddler
Karl Maka as Albert
Sylvia Chang as restaurant cleaner
Eric Tsang as shoeshine boy
Lau Kar-wing as butcher
Alan Tam as shampoo boy
Wong Wan-choi as doctor
Wong Ngai-yee as nurse
Si Gai-keung as fake cop
Kam San as Secretary Lo
Tai San as Wong's thug
Shing Wan-in as Wong's thug
Yeung Yau-cheung as Wong's chauffeur
Shing Fui-On as butcher's customer
Cho Tat-wah as Mr. Chao
Ho Hen as Mr. Chimp
Billy Lau as Bing's thug
Ng Kwok-kin as fake policeman
Raymond Fung as Manager Hung

See also
 List of Hong Kong films

External links
  
 hkcinemagic entry

1982 films
1982 comedy films
Hong Kong slapstick comedy films
1980s Cantonese-language films
Films set in Hong Kong
Films shot in Hong Kong
Films set in Thailand
1980s Hong Kong films